Interstate 90 (I-90) is an east–west transcontinental Interstate Highway across the  northern United States, linking Seattle to Boston. Due to the large size of Montana, it is the longest segment of I-90 within a single state.

Route description

Mineral County 
About  from the rest stop is a diamond interchange, serving a small minor road into the St. Joe National Forest in Idaho.

The highway continues, winding through the woodlands until another diamond interchange, serving the small unincorporated community of Saltese.

 after Haugan, I-90 intersects the census-designated place (CDP) of De Borgia, continuing southeasterly, intersecting several minor roads, before reaching the CDP of St. Regis and Montana Highway 135 (MT 135). The highway stops paralleling the St. Regis River, and begins to parallel, and cross over several times, the Clark Fork River. After leaving the rest area, the highway straightens out, heading easterly. The highway continues east before exiting the county, just south of Alberton.

Missoula, Granite, and Powell counties 

Entering Missoula County, the highway intersects Alberton, before continuing easterly through Huson and Secondary Highway 263 (S-263). The highway continues southeast before intersecting the concurrent highways US Highway 93 (US 93) and MT 200, which join I-90 from the west. The three highways continue into the county seat of Missoula, where, at the first exit, US 93 leaves on the western border of Missoula and travels through Orchard Homes. The next two exits travel into Downtown Missoula, while the last exit serves East Missoula. US 12 joins I-90 and MT 200 exits to the north of the highway outside of Missoula, paralleling the Blackfoot River as I-90 continues east, following and then intersecting S-210 in Clinton. The Bearmouth rest area,  from the Idaho border, is intersected before crossing the Missoula–Granite county border.

After entering Granite County, I-90 has an interchange with an access road to the Garnet Back Country Byway, providing access to the Garnet Range on the west slope of the Rocky Mountains. The highway passes north of Lolo National Forest while headed easterly. The highway continues through northern Granite county, intersecting MT 1 before exiting the county entering Powell County. I-90 intersects S-272  after entering the county, which clips the eastern segment of Lolo National Forest, before the seasonal Gold Creek rest area is intersected. Garrison is northeast of the highway as US 12 ends its concurrency, traveling north from I-90 toward the state capital of Helena. I-90 turns south, paralleling former Northern Pacific Railway trackage, before intersecting S-275 and the county seat, Deer Lodge. Continuing south, I-90 exits Powell County at Racetrack.

Deer Lodge, Silver Bow, and Jefferson counties 
I-90 bisects the northern tip of Deer Lodge County, in a southwesterly direction. Galen and S-273 are intersected, before the highway passes west of the Warm Springs State Wildlife Management Area. After passing the wildlife management area, the highway passes by Warm Springs and MT 48. Just northwest of the Deer Lodge–Silver Bow county border, I-90 intersects MT 1.

Fairmont Hot Springs Resort, accessible via S-441, is the first exit in Silver Bow County on I-90, as the highway starts to turn back toward the east. Ramsay is located in the southwest corner of the interchange where I-15 becomes concurrent with I-90 through Butte. On the western edge of Butte, I-115 continues east into town, as I-15/I-90 turns southeast, bypassing most of downtown Butte. After traveling the pass, an emergency escape ramp can be found on the highway's eastbound lanes. Jefferson County has interchanges with S-399 east of Pipestone, Montana and S-359 east of Cardwell before meeting the Jefferson–Broadwater county border.

Broadwater, Gallatin, and Park counties 

There is only one exit along I-90 in Broadwater County, linking MT 2 in the south and US 287 north of the highway before crossing the Broadwater–Gallatin county border at the Missouri River. I-90 parallels S-205, bypassing the towns of Trident, Logan, Manhattan, and Belgrade on the north of the highway. A new interchange was constructed just east of Belgrade (exit 299) that services Bozeman Yellowstone International Airport to the north and the western area of the city of Bozeman. MT 85 travels south from I-90 in Belgrade, providing access to Bozeman Hot Springs. The highway then enters the city of Bozeman, the county seat, and intersects and becomes concurrent with US 191. US 89 intersects I-90 in the county seat of Livingston and passes over the Yellowstone River. The highway continues northeasterly, paralleling the river, intersecting S-295 before crossing the Park–Sweet Grass county border.

Sweet Grass and Stillwater counties 

Still paralleling the Yellowstone River, I-90 travels northwest intersecting S-298 and US 191 in the county seat of Big Timber. The highway passes through the Sweet Grass–Stillwater county border just west of Reed Point. After passing into Stillwater County, I-90 crosses over the river, and enters the county seat of Columbus, intersecting MT 78 south of the highway and S-306 on the north side of the highway. The highway is titled the Robert E. Ewing Jr. Memorial Highway between mileposts 410 and 424. I-90 intersects the Columbus rest area,  from the Idaho border, followed by Park City before exiting Stillwater County.

Yellowstone and Big Horn counties 
US 212 becomes concurrent with I-90 just east of Laurel before entering the county seat of Billings. I-90 Business (I-90 Bus.) passes into town as the main freeway travels south of Billings and bisects Billings Heights and Lockwood intersecting MT 3 and US 87, which joins the I-90/US 212 concurrency. On the extreme eastern end of Billings, the three highways intersect the western terminus of I-94, which heads northeast toward North Dakota, while I-90 turns southeast into Big Horn County. Immediately after entering Big Horn County, the three highways pass the seasonal Hardin rest area. Entering Hardin, the county seat, the three highways intersect S-313 and MT 47. S-313 provides access to Yellowtail Dam, while MT 47 connects back to I-94. After exiting Hardin, I-90 turns south, entering the Crow Indian Reservation and intersects S-384, before reaching Crow Agency. Crow Agency is home to Little Bighorn Battlefield National Monument and Reno–Benteen Battlefield Memorial, which are passed after US 212 departs to the east. Continuing south, I-90/US 87 parallels S-451 and the Little Bighorn River, passing by Garryowen, Benteen, Lodge Grass, and Wyola before exiting the state of Montana and entering Sheridan County, Wyoming.

History 
I-90 replaced US 10 between Livingston and the Idaho border, and, before that, the Yellowstone Trail. The section over Homestake Pass cost $18.5 million (equivalent to $ in ) to construct and was completed on October 30, 1966. The final two-lane section of the highway, near Springdale, was expanded to four lanes in May 1987.

Until 1995 in Montana near the Idaho border, I-90 was not a divided highway for a few stretches, having only a narrow paved median.

From 1995 until 1999, the daytime maximum speed limit in Montana was "reasonable and prudent". The western  have a lower speed limit, as well as the Missoula and Butte urban areas.

In 1996, a section of I-90 was closed for 19 days due to a train derailment and chlorine spill near Alberton.

Expansion of the Billings area corridor 

The 2012 Billings area I-90 corridor planning study recommends many improvements to the corridor from Laurel through Lockwood, including construction of new east and westbound bridges over the Yellowstone River, with each bridge having three to four traffic lanes. Also recommended are construction of additional eastbound and westbound traffic lanes from Shiloh to Johnson Lane and reconstruction and widening of many of the bridges, interchanges and on/offramps along the corridor at an estimated cost of $114 million.

Exit list

See also

References

External links 

 Montana
90
Transportation in Mineral County, Montana
Transportation in Missoula County, Montana
Transportation in Granite County, Montana
Transportation in Powell County, Montana
Transportation in Deer Lodge County, Montana
Transportation in Silver Bow County, Montana
Transportation in Jefferson County, Montana
Transportation in Broadwater County, Montana
Transportation in Gallatin County, Montana
Transportation in Park County, Montana
Transportation in Sweet Grass County, Montana
Transportation in Stillwater County, Montana
Transportation in Yellowstone County, Montana
Transportation in Big Horn County, Montana